The West Indies cricket team toured England in the 1950 season to play a four-match Test series against England.

West Indies won the series 3–1 with no matches drawn. The second Test at Lord's was the first time that the West Indies had won a match in England; in that match Ramadhin took 5 wickets for 66 runs and 6 for 86, whilst Valentine took 4 for 48 and 3 for 79.

Wisden in 1951 named four West Indian players as Cricketer of the Year. They were Sonny Ramadhin, Alf Valentine, Everton Weekes and Frank Worrell. The fifth player was England wicket-keeper Godfrey Evans. For the source, see Wisden 1951 in Cricinfo.

West Indies team
The following players were selected for the tour:
John Goddard (captain) (Barbados)
Robert Christiani (Guyana)
Gerry Gomez (T&T)
Hines Johnson (Jamaica)
Prior Jones (T&T)
Roy Marshall (Barbados)
Lance Pierre (T&T)
Allan Rae (Jamaica)
Sonny Ramadhin (T&T)
Jeff Stollmeyer (T&T)
Kenneth Trestrail (T&T)
Alf Valentine (Jamaica)
Clyde Walcott (Barbados)
Everton Weekes (Barbados)
Cecil Williams (Barbados)
Frank Worrell (Barbados)

Eleven of the sixteen players had already appeared in test cricket. Ramadhin and Valentine made their test debuts in this series. Marshall made his test debut in a later series. Trestrail and Williams never played test cricket.

Test series summary

First Test

References

Sources
 CricketArchive and West Indies in England 1950
 Wisden 1951 and West Indies in England 1950
 Playfair Cricket Annual 1951
 Wisden Cricketers' Almanack 1951
 Michael Manley, A History Of West Indies Cricket, Andre Deutsch, 1988

1950 in English cricket
1950 in West Indian cricket
1950
International cricket competitions from 1945–46 to 1960